Victor Hanna Batarseh (born 1935) was the mayor of Bethlehem in the West Bank, from 2005 until 2012. He was replaced by Vera Baboun.

See also
Palestinian Christians

External links
article by him in The Hill

Mayors of Bethlehem
Palestinian Roman Catholics
Living people
1935 births
Place of birth missing (living people)
Date of birth missing (living people)